was a monthly released microcomputer magazine in Japan, published by ASCII Corporation from 1977. It targeted business users who used a personal computer in their home and office, but it sometimes introduced computer games and computer music. It was also known as the  written along with the title from Vol. 2 No. 4, and distinguish with the  founded in 1997. Its news website and the Weekly ASCII are continuing as in 2016.

Foundation 

In 1976, NEC released the TK-80, a single-board computer kit, and it became popular among hobbyists in Japan.  joined foundation of the first Japanese microcomputer magazine I/O (ja) as an editor when he was a student at the Waseda University. The I/O initially served information for assembled microcomputer systems with a few video game columns. Growing the video game market, it was shifted to a video game magazine. Against it, Nishi considered that personal computers must have far more potential than video games.

In April 1977, Nishi left the company, borrowed money from his grandmother and visited the West Coast Computer Faire held in San Francisco. Then, he realized the difference between Japan and the United States. "In Japan, the TK-80 just caused a microcomputer craze. While in the United States, it seems the beginning of the personal computer revolution. Each persons try to face a personal computer, based on their own identity," he said.

They published the ASCII as a microcomputer magazine for business, while the I/O was for hobbyists. The first issue was sold 5,000 copies. It became one of the most popular computer magazine in 1980s in Japan. In 1999, the magazine reached its largest circulation of 170,000 copies.

References

External links
 ASCII.jp 

Defunct computer magazines
Defunct magazines published in Japan
Magazines established in 1977
Magazines disestablished in 2008
Magazines published in Tokyo
Monthly magazines published in Japan